Alexander Roberts Dunn VC (15 September 1833 – 25 January 1868) was the first Canadian awarded the Victoria Cross, the highest and most prestigious award for bravery in the face of the enemy that can be awarded to British and Commonwealth forces.  Later in life, he assisted in raising a regiment in Canada for the British Army. He was the first Canadian to command a British Army regiment.

Dunn died of a gunshot wound under mysterious circumstances in Abyssinia (now Eritrea), where he was part of the British Expedition to Abyssinia.  His grave was re-discovered by Canadian Armed Forces troops who were part of the United Nations peacekeeping force to the Eritrea-Ethiopia war of 2000-2001.

Family and early life

Dunn was born in York, Upper Canada (later Toronto, Ontario) in 1833, the son of John Henry Dunn, Receiver General of Upper Canada, and studied at Upper Canada College.  When his family returned to England, he attended Harrow School. In 1852 at the age of 19, he purchased a commission in a cavalry regiment in the British Army, the 11th Hussars (Prince Albert’s Own).  Dunn was six feet, three inches tall, and commissioned a special four foot long sabre from Wilkinson Sword to accommodate his height.

Charge of the Light Brigade and the Victoria Cross 

Dunn was awarded the Victoria Cross for his actions at the Charge of the Light Brigade during the Battle of Balaclava on 25 October 1854, when he was 21 years of age.

Lieutenant Dunn was actively engaged in the battle, leading his troops in the futile attempts to capture the Russian artillery.  When the retreat was finally called, he saw that one of his troopers, Sergeant Robert Bentley, was in trouble.  Bentley's horse was badly wounded. Russian lancers had picked Bentley out as a straggler and were attacking him, trying to knock him out of the saddle.  Dunn wheeled his horse and returned to Bentley's aid. He killed two or three of the Russian soldiers, lifted Bentley back up on his horse, and slapped its rear to get it moving back to safety.  Dunn then noticed that another soldier from his troop, Private Harvey Levett, had been dismounted and was being attacked by a Russian hussar.  Dunn came to Levett's aid, killing the Russian hussar with his lengthy sabre.

When he was finally back to safety, Dunn found that only 25 had survived from his troop of 110 cavalrymen.  Dunn broke down and cried.

Queen Victoria instituted the Victoria Cross in 1856, for conspicuous acts of bravery by any member of the British military.  The award was available for events from 1854 onwards, to include acts of bravery during the Crimean War, which began in late 1853.  After the war, it was announced that the 11th Hussars could nominate a soldier to receive the Victoria Cross for his bravery.  Dunn was the unanimous choice of the regiment.  His name was on the list of the first group of recipients of the Victoria Cross, announced in February 1857.

On 26 June 1857, Queen Victoria presented the first sixty-two Victoria Crosses at an awards ceremony in Hyde Park, in front of a crowd of 100,000. Although Dunn by that time had left the 11th Hussars, he was amongst that group of the first recipients.

Later military career 
Dunn sold his commission at the end of the Crimean War, having conducted an affair with the wife of a fellow officer.  She left her husband for Dunn.  He returned to Canada in 1856, where he initially ran his family's estate, north of Toronto, and joined a local Masonic lodge.

In 1857, the Indian Mutiny began.  Dunn assisted in raising a regiment in Canada for the British Army, the 100th (Prince of Wales's Royal Canadian) Regiment of Foot, which he joined with the rank of major. When the 100th Regiment was leaving for Britain, Dunn was presented with a sword which had been recently found on the Plains of Abraham, and was thought to have belonged to General Wolfe.  After arriving in Britain, the 100th Regiment was sent to Gibraltar to act as garrison troops.

Dunn exchanged into the 33rd Regiment of Foot in 1864, as a lieutenant-colonel.  He was promoted to the rank of colonel in 1866, the youngest colonel in the British Army.  At the start of the British Expedition to Abyssinia in 1868, he was given the command of the 33rd Regiment, the first Canadian to command a British regiment, but was killed in unusual circumstances during a hunting accident at Senafe before the military part of the campaign started.

Death  in Abyssinia 

The accounts of Dunn's death vary.  It occurred at the town of Senafe in Abyssinia (now Eritrea).  The official version from the 33rd Regiment is that Dunn was holding his rifle and trying to uncork a brandy flask, when the rifle slipped between his legs and discharged into his chest.  He told his servant to run for a doctor, but by the time help arrived, Dunn was dead.  However, another version is that Dunn dismounted from his horse and sent his servant to get water for the horse.  When the servant returned, Dunn was found dead, possibly a suicide.  Still other rumours circulated, possibly of murder.

Dunn's grave
Dunn was buried in a local cemetery in Senafe.  The location was eventually forgotten, until the end of World War II.  A British soldier, leading a patrol of Eritrean Mounted Police, came across a grown-over cemetery, but found that one gravesite had been cleaned and tended recently.  It was Dunn's grave.  Soldiers of the occupying Italian forces had tended the grave, even though they were at war with the Canadian and British armies.  The British sent a report to London, but it appears to have been lost for some decades.

Half a century later, the grave was re-discovered by Canadian peacekeeping soldiers, who were part of the United Nations Mission in Ethiopia and Eritrea during the Eritrean–Ethiopian War of 1998–2000. Ben Mitchell of the Canadian Armed Forces gave his account of the re-discovery:

After the re-discovery of the grave, a group of Canadian Forces engineers from CFB Gagetown repaired it in 2001.

Legacy 
In addition to the Victoria Cross, Dunn was also awarded the British Crimea Medal with four clasps, for the Battle of the Alma (1854), the Battle of Balaclava (1854), the Battle of Inkermann (1854), and the siege of Sevastopol (1854–1855). He also received the Turkish Crimean War Medal, and the British Abyssinian War Medal.

Dunn's medals came on sale at Sotheby's in 1894.  The federal government authorised Sir Charles Tupper, the Canadian High Commissioner to Britain, to buy the medals.  They were brought to Canada and eventually placed on display in the main foyer of his old school, Upper Canada College, in Toronto. In 1977, due to a number of recent thefts and losses of Victoria Cross medals, the school replaced the Victoria Cross with a copy and moved the original to their bank safe deposit box.  In 
2006, Upper Canada College placed the medals on loan to the Canadian War Museum in Ottawa.

In 1894, one of Dunn's fellow-officers from the 100th Royal Canadian Regiment of Foot sent three souvenirs back to Canada, including Dunn's camp-stool from the Crimea.  The camp-stool and Dunn's sword are now also on display at the Canadian War Museum.

The City of Ottawa, assisted by Royal Canadian Legion Branch 638 (Kanata), created Alexander Dunn Park, dedicated to Dunn's memory.  The park is located on Bellrock Drive in Ottawa.

There is a memorial plaque dedicated to Dunn at Clarence Square in Toronto, near where Dunn was born.

References

External links 	
 
 https://unmee.unmissions.org/background

Canadian recipients of the Victoria Cross
Crimean War recipients of the Victoria Cross
1833 births
1868 deaths
People educated at Harrow School
Upper Canada College alumni
11th Hussars officers
33rd Regiment of Foot officers
Prince of Wales's Leinster Regiment officers
British Army personnel of the Crimean War
British military personnel of the Abyssinian War
People from York, Toronto
British Army recipients of the Victoria Cross